The Silesian Institute in Katowice was a regional scientific organization collecting local information about Polish region of Silesia, working in Katowice in years 1934–1939 and 1945–1949, and during the Nazi occupation of Poland, during World War II (1939–1945) as an underground movement in Warsaw, Kraków and Lviv.

In years 1945–1948 the Silesian Institute founded its branches in Wrocław and Kłodzko and also the J.Badtkie Library in Cieplice Śląskie (Biblioteka im. J. Badtkiego w Cieplicach Śląskich). During the reorganization in 1948 the Silesian Institute became part of the Western Institute (Instytut Zachodni) in Poznań.

The works and tradition of the Silesian institute is continued by the Silesian Institute in Opole (Instytut Śląski w Opolu) established in 1957 and the Silesian Scientific Institute in Katowice (Śląski Instutut Naukowy w Katowicach) established 1958.

Organisations based in Katowice
Silesian culture
Education in Katowice
Learned societies of Poland
Polish regional societies